Joseph Kille (April 12, 1790 - March 1, 1865) was a Representative from New Jersey; born near Bridgeport, Gloucester County, N.J., April 12, 1790; pursued academic studies; located in Salem; sheriff of Salem County, New Jersey from 1822 to 1829, and county clerk of Salem County from 1829 to 1839. He was a member of the New Jersey General Assembly in 1856.

Kille was elected as a Democrat to the Twenty-sixth Congress (March 4, 1839 – March 3, 1841).

He died in Salem on March 1, 1865, and was interred there in St. John's Episcopal Cemetery.

References

1790 births
1865 deaths
Democratic Party members of the New Jersey General Assembly
People from Salem County, New Jersey
Burials at St. John's Episcopal Cemetery, Salem, New Jersey
County clerks in New Jersey
New Jersey sheriffs
Democratic Party members of the United States House of Representatives from New Jersey
19th-century American politicians